Kusalar (also Romanized as Kūsālār) is a village in Owch Hacha Rural District, in the Central District of Ahar County, East Azerbaijan Province, Iran. At the 2006 census, its population was 106, in 26 families.

References 

Populated places in Ahar County